Hajjah Nawab Begum (Queen) Sultan Jahan  (9 July 1858 – 12 May 1930) was the ruling Begum of Bhopal between 1901 and 1926.

Biography

Early life
Sarkar Amman known better as Sultan Jahan, was born at Bhopal, the elder and only surviving child of Nawab Begum Sultan Shah Jahan and her husband General HH Nasir ud-Daula, Nawab Baqi Muhammad Khan Bahadur (1823–1867). In 1868, she was proclaimed heiress apparent to the Bhopal musnaid following the death of her grandmother, Sikander Begum and her mother's succession to the throne. In 1901, Sultan Jahan succeeded her mother at her death, becoming Nawab Begum of Dar-ul-Iqbal-i-Bhopal.

Nawab Begum 

A great reformer in the tradition of her mother and grandmother, Sultan Jahan founded several important educational institutions in Bhopal, establishing free and compulsory primary education in 1918. During her reign, she had a particular focus on public instruction, especially female education. She built many technical institutes and schools and increased the number of qualified teachers. From 1920 until her death, she was the founding Chancellor of Aligarh Muslim University. As of 2020, she is the only women to have served as Chancellor of  Aligarh Muslim University.

Not just a reformer in the field of education, the Nawab Begum reformed taxation, the army, police, the judiciary and the jails, expanded agriculture, and constructed extensive irrigation and public works in the state. Also, she established an Executive and Legislative State Council in 1922 and began open elections for the municipalities.

In 1914, she was the President of the All-India Muslim Ladies' Association. Sultan Jahan's primary legacy, though, was in the field of public health, as she pioneered widespread inoculation and vaccination programs and improved the water supply and standards of hygiene and sanitation. A prolific author, she wrote several books on education, health and other topics, including Hidayat uz-Zaujan, Sabil ul-Jinan,
Tandurusti (Health), Bachchon-ki-Parwarish, 
Hidayat Timardari, Maishat-o-Moashirat. Owing to her numerous activities, she was the recipient of numerous honours and awards.

In 1926, after a reign of 25 years, Sultan Jahan abdicated the throne in favour of her youngest child and only surviving son, Hamidullah Khan. She died four years later, aged 71.

In popular culture 
Begamon Ka Bhopal (2017), is a documentary film directed by Rachita Gorowala and produced by the Government of India's Films Division. It explores her life along with the other Begums of Bhopal.

Family
On 1 February 1874, Sultan Jahan married HH Ali Jah, Ihtisham ul-Mulk, Nasir ud-Daula, Nawab Ahmad Ali Khan Bahadur, Sultan Dulha Sahib, Nawab Consort of Bhopal, (1854–1902), 9th cousin, once removed, and a member of the senior male-line branch of the dynasty. The couple had three sons and two daughters:

 1. Sahibzadi Bilqis Jahan Muzaffar Begum Sahiba (25 October 1875 – 23 December 1887)
 2. Colonel Ali Jah, Nawab Hafiz Sir Muhammad Nasru'llah Khan Sahib Bahadur, Wali Ahad Bahadur, KCSI (3 December 1876 – 3 September 1924). Heir Apparent of Bhopal, granted a personal salute of 9-guns in 1901; commissioned a Major in 1912, promoted to Colonel in 1918. Named Chief Conservator of Forests in 1924, he was married twice and had two sons and a daughter
 3. Major-General Al-Haj Mohsin ul-Mulk, Nawab Hafiz Muhammad Ubaidu'llah Khan Sahib Bahadur, CSI (30 November 1878 – 24 March 1924). Brigadier and C-in-C of the Bhopal State Forces and Imperial Service Troops, 1905; promoted to Major-General in 1918. Commissioned a Captain in the Indian Army in 1909; promoted to Major in 1911 and to Lieutenant-Colonel in 1921; married and had four sons and a daughter
 4. Sahibzadi Asif Jahan Begum Sahiba (5 August 1880 – 22 July 1894)
 5. HH Sikander Saulat, Iftikhar ul-Mulk, Al-Haj Nawab Hafiz Muhammad Hamidullah Khan Bahadur (9 September 1894 – 4 February 1960). Successor and Nawab of Dar ul-Iqbal-i-Bhopal

Titles
1858–1868: Nawabzadi Sultan Kaikhusrau Jahan Begum Sahiba
1868–1877: Nawabzadi Sultan Kaikhusrau Jahan Begum Sahiba, Wali Ahad Bahadur
1877–1901: Nawabzadi Sultan Kaikhusrau Jahan Begum Sahiba, Wali Ahad Bahadur
1901–1904: Her Highness Sikander Saulat, Iftikhar ul-Mulk, Nawab Sultan Kaikhusrau Jahan Begum Sahiba, Nawab Begum of Dar ul-Iqbal-i-Bhopal
1904–1910: Her Highness Sikander Saulat, Iftikhar ul-Mulk, Nawab Dame Sultan Kaikhusrau Jahan Begum Sahiba, Nawab Begum of Dar ul-Iqbal-i-Bhopal, GCIE
1910–1911: Her Highness Sikander Saulat, Iftikhar ul-Mulk, Nawab Dame Sultan Kaikhusrau Jahan Begum Sahiba, Nawab Begum of Dar ul-Iqbal-i-Bhopal, GCSI, GCIE
1911–1916: Her Highness Sikander Saulat, Iftikhar ul-Mulk, Nawab Dame Sultan Kaikhusrau Jahan Begum Sahiba, Nawab Begum of Dar ul-Iqbal-i-Bhopal, GCSI, GCIE, CI
1916–1917: Her Highness Sikander Saulat, Iftikhar ul-Mulk, Nawab Dame Sultan Kaikhusrau Jahan Begum Sahiba, Nawab Begum of Dar ul-Iqbal-i-Bhopal, GCSI, GCIE, GCStJ, CI
1917–1930: Her Highness Sikander Saulat, Iftikhar ul-Mulk, Nawab Dame Sultan Kaikhusrau Jahan Begum Sahiba, Nawab Begum of Dar ul-Iqbal-i-Bhopal, GCSI, GCIE, GBE, GCStJ, CI

Honours
Empress of India Medal silver – 1877
Delhi Durbar gold medal – 1903
Knight Grand Commander of the Order of the Indian Empire (GCIE) – 1904
Knight Grand Commander of the Order of the Star of India (GCSI) – 1910
Companion of the Order of the Crown of India (CI) – 1911
Order of Nobility (Nishan-i-Majidi) of the Ottoman Empire – 1911
Knight Grand Cross of the Venerable Order of Saint John (GCStJ) – 1916
Knight Grand Cross of the Order of the British Empire (GBE) – 1917

References

External links 
 Hayat-i-Qudsi, life of the Nawab Gauhar Begum alias the Nawab Begum Qudsia of Bhopal by Sultan Jahan (1918)

1858 births
1930 deaths
Begums of Bhopal
Indian female royalty
20th-century Indian Muslims
Knights Grand Commander of the Order of the Star of India
Companions of the Order of the Crown of India
Indian Dames Grand Cross of the Order of the British Empire
Dames Grand Cross of the Order of St John
Double dames
20th-century women rulers
Monarchs who abdicated
20th-century Indian women
20th-century Indian people
Hindi-language writers